Elizabeth High School may refer to:

Australia
Elizabeth High School, Elizabeth, South Australia (from 1961 – 1988, see Playford International College)

United States
Elizabeth High School (New Jersey) – Elizabeth, New Jersey
Elizabeth High School (Colorado) – Elizabeth, Colorado
Elizabeth High School (Louisiana) – Elizabeth, Louisiana
Elizabeth Forward High School – Elizabeth, Pennsylvania
Elizabeth Seton High School – Bladensburg, Maryland
St. Elizabeth Academy (St. Louis, Missouri) – St. Louis, Missouri
St. Elizabeth High School (California) – Oakland, California
St. Elizabeth High School (Delaware) – Wilmington, Delaware
St. Elizabeth High School (Missouri) – St. Elizabeth, Missouri
Academy of St. Elizabeth – Convent Station, New Jersey
Cape Elizabeth High School – Cape Elizabeth, Maine